was a town located in Minaminaka District, Miyazaki, Japan.

As of 2008, the town had an estimated population of 4,859 and a population density of 27.2 persons per km². The town's total area was 178.49 km².

On March 30, 2009, Kitagō, along with the town of Nangō (also from Minaminaka District), was merged into the expanded city of Nichinan. Minaminaka District was dissolved as a result of this merger.

It was bordered by Nichinan City to the south and east; Kiyotake Town and Miyazaki City to the north; and Mimata Town to the west.

Kitago literally means "north shire". The town is in the northern part of the former Obi Shire, Himuka.

History
The town was established as a village in 1889 by merging the villages of Gonohara, Ofuji and Kitagawachi; which was later elevated to town status in 1959.

Land use

Rice Field:      2.2%
Other Farmland:  1.1%
Residential:     1.1%
Mountain Forest: 88.2%
Wilderness:      0.1%
Mixed Use:       3.9%
Other:           3.3%

References

External links
 Nichinan official website 

Dissolved municipalities of Miyazaki Prefecture